Khilona is a 1970 Indian Hindi-language drama film, produced by L. V. Prasad under the Prasad Productions Pvt. Ltd. banner and directed by Chander Vohra. It stars Sanjeev Kumar, Mumtaz, Jeetendra in lead roles and music composed by Laxmikant–Pyarelal. The film is recorded as a "Super Hit" at Box Office India. The film was a remake of the Telugu film Punarjanma (1963) and it was simultaneously made in Tamil as Engirundho Vandhaal.

The film received six nominations at the 18th Filmfare Awards in 1971, of which it won the Filmfare Best Movie Award and Filmfare Best Actress Award for Mumtaz. Other nominations were for Best Actor (Sanjeev Kumar), Best Comic (Jagdeep), Best Story (Gulshan Nanda) and Best Male Playback Singer (Mohammed Rafi).

Plot
Vijaykamal is a son of rich Thakur Suraj Singh, but has lost his mind. He sees his lover Sapna marry his neighbor Bihari and then she commit suicide on the night of the Diwali party hosted by Bihari. This incident puts Vijay in shock. Thakur believes that if Vijay gets married, his mental health would improve. He hence approaches a tawaif, Chand to pretend to be Vijay's wife and thus help him get better. But Chand receives cold treatment from Vijay's mother and his elder brother Kishore. Once, in a fit of madness, Vijay rapes Chand. But later, Chand becomes very friendly with Vijay and that starts improving his condition.

Bihari who wishes to have Chand for himself also tries to persuade Vijay's young sister Radha. He promises Radha to make her an actress in Bollywood and asks her to elope with him with the family's money and gold. But Chand does not let Bihari's plan work. Vijay's younger brother Mohan also falls in love with noble Chand and is heartbroken when he finds out that she is pregnant (owing to the assault) and is carrying Vijay's child. Dejected, he leaves home without notice.

In a fight between Vijay and Bihari, Bihari falls off the terrace and this shocks Vijay, curing him of his mental ailment. But then Vijay is unable to recall Chand. She is then humiliated by the family and is thrown out of the house. Mohan steps in and accuses everyone of treating her like a toy and only using her when needed. He reveals how she saved Radha from Bihari's evil pursuits. It is also revealed that Chand was actually born in a noble family and was only raised as a tawaif as she was found alone after a train accident. The family thus accepts Chand and all ends well.

Cast

Sanjeev Kumar as Vijaykamal Singh
Mumtaz as Chand
Jeetendra as  Mohan Singh
Shatrughan Sinha as Bihari
Bipin Gupta as Thakur Suraj Singh
Durga Khote as Thakurain Singh
Ramesh Deo as Kishore Singh
Chand Usmani as Laxmi Singh
Jayshree T. as Radha Singh
Jagdeep as Mahesh
Malika as Shashibala
Jankidas as Advocate Jankidas
Satyen Kappu as Advocate
Viju Khote as Johnson 
Mridula Rani as Hirabai
Alka as Sapna

Soundtrack
All the songs were composed by Laxmikant-Pyarelal and lyrics were penned by Anand Bakshi.

Awards
The film won two Filmfare Awards out of the six nominations it received.
Best Movie
Best Actress - Mumtaz
Other four nominations that it received were:
Best Actor - Sanjeev Kumar
Best Comedian - Jagdeep
Best Story - Gulshan Nanda
Best Male Playback Singer - Mohd. Rafi for the song "Khilona Jaankar Tum Kyu"

References

External links
 

1970s Hindi-language films
1970 drama films
Films about mental health
Films about courtesans in India
Films scored by Laxmikant–Pyarelal
Films based on Indian novels
Hindi remakes of Telugu films
Indian drama films
Hindi-language drama films